Chorazin (also Chorazain) or Korazim (also Chorizim) was an ancient village in the Roman and Byzantine periods, best known from the Christian Gospels. It stood on the Korazim Plateau in the Upper Galilee on a hill above the northern shore of the Sea of Galilee,   from Capernaum in what is now the territory of modern Israel.

Khirbat Karraza (also Karraza, Kh. Karazeh, Kerazeh) was a Palestinian village established at the site of the ancient village and depopulated during the 1947–1948 Civil War in Mandatory Palestine on May 4, 1948, by the Palmach's First Battalion during Operation Yiftach. It was located 8.5 km southeast of Safad.

The nearby Israeli town of Korazim is named for this location.

History
Two settlement phases have been proposed based on coin and pottery findings. The town was partially destroyed in the 4th century, possibly as a result of an earthquake. The settlement of Khirbat Karraza subsequently developed on the site.

During Ottoman control, Khirbat Karraza was populated by the Zanghariyya Bedouin tribe and the village contained a shrine for a local Muslim saint, al-Shaykh Ramadan. The villagers used to store grain close to the shrine, certain that nobody would steal it and thereby violate the sanctity of the shrine.

The Palestinian historian Walid Khalidi described the site in 1992: "Some village houses still stand, together with the remains of other houses. One of the old houses has been renovated. Also remaining is the tomb of Shaykh Ramadan, around which the village shrine had been built. The tomb is collapsing and the building in which it was housed no longer exists. It is surrounded by large carob trees."

Archaeological excavations
Extensive excavations and a survey were carried out in 1962–1964. Excavations at the site were resumed in 1980–1987.

In 2004, a small-scale salvage excavation was conducted by the Israel Antiquities Authority along the route of an ancient road north of Moshav Amnun. In the literature, the road is referred to as "the way through Korazim." It crossed the Chorazin plateau from west to east, branching off from the main Cairo–Damascus road that ran northeast toward Daughters of Jacob Bridge. The main settlement dates to the 3rd and 4th centuries. The majority of the structures found were made from basalt, a black volcanic rock found locally. Close by is a ritual bath (mikvah), surrounded by public and residential buildings. The handful of olive millstones used in olive oil extraction found suggest a reliance on the olive for economic purposes, like a number of other villages in ancient Galilee.

Synagogue

A synagogue whose ruins are still visible today was built in the late 3rd century, destroyed in the 4th century, and rebuilt in the 6th century.

The large, impressive synagogue which was built of basalt stones and decorated with Jewish motifs is the most striking of the surviving structures. An unusual feature in an ancient synagogue is the presence of three-dimensional sculpture, a pair of stone lions. A similar pair of three-dimensional lions was found in the synagogue at Kfar Bar'am. Other carvings, which are thought to have originally been brightly painted, feature images of wine-making, animals, a Medusa, an armed soldier, and an eagle. In 1926, archaeologists discovered a "Seat of Moses," carved from a basalt block. According to the New Testament, this is where the reader of the Torah sat to deliver his message to the congregation.

Second synagogue?
Jacob Ory, who excavated the site in 1926 on behalf of the British Mandate Department of Antiquities, wrote about a second synagogue ca. 200 m west of the first one, and he described it in detail. Later excavations, however, have not been able to find the remains noted by him.

Appearance in religious texts

New Testament
Chorazin, along with Bethsaida and Capernaum, was named in the Christian gospels of Matthew and Luke as cities in which Jesus of Nazareth performed his mission. However, because these towns seemingly rejected his message ("they had not changed their ways"), they were subsequently cursed (Matthew 11:20-24; Luke 10:13-15). Due to this condemnation, the influential but non-canonical Apocalypse of Pseudo-Methodius predicted that the Antichrist would be conceived in Chorazin.

Babylonian Talmud
The Babylonian Talmud (redacted until c. 475) mentions that Chorazin was a town specifically known for its grain (Menahot, 85a).

Identification

Doubts
The English theologian John Lightfoot writing in the 17th century suggested that Chorazin might have referred to a wider area around Cana in Galilee, rather than a single city/village:
What if, under this name, Cana be concluded, and some small country adjacent, which, from its situation in a wood, might be named "Chorazin", that is, 'the woody country'? Cana is famous for the frequent presence and miracles of Christ. But away with conjecture, when it grows too bold.

In his Biblical Researches in Palestine in the mid-nineteenth century, Edward Robinson visited Khirbat Karraza, but concluded it was not the Biblical Chorazin, because the ruins were not significant enough and the site was not near the shore of the Sea of Galilee, as stated by Jerome (Lacum Genesareth, in cujus litore Capernaum et Tiberias et Bethsaida et Chorozaim sitæ sint):
The ruins we had been told of lie on the west side of this same valley, a quarter of a mile southwest, near its entrance into the main Wady. They consist simply of a few foundations of black stones ; the remains evidently of a poor and inconsiderable village. They are known as Khirbet Kerâzeh. We did not go to them, as there was no path; and because they were in full view. Their distance from Tell Hùm must be reckoned at about three miles. We had come to this spot, because the name Kerázeh bears a degree of resemblance to the Chorazin of the New Testament; and we hoped to find, in the ruins or the situation, something which might determine the position of that ancient place. In this we felt ourselves disappointed. The remains are too trivial to have ever belonged to a place of any importance. Chorazin, too, according to Jerome, lay upon the shore of the lake; but this site is an hour distant. shut in among the hills, without any view of the lake, and remote from any public road whether ancient or modern.

In popular culture
The writer M.R. James mentions "Chorazin" as a place of ill-repute and a location on "the black pilgrimage", in his 1904 ghost story, "Count Magnus".

See also
Ancient synagogues in the Palestine region
Ancient synagogues in Israel
Archaeology of Israel
Jesus trail
National parks of Israel
Oldest synagogues in the world
Woes to the unrepentant cities, pronounced by Jesus and which included Chorazin
Former and current villages inhabited by the Zanghariyya Bedouin tribe:
 Al-Zanghariyya
 Tuba-Zangariyye

References

Bibliography

 Z. Yeivin, The Synagogue at Korazim; The 1962 - 1964, 1980 - 1987 Excavations, Israel Antiquities Authority Reports, Israel Antiquities Authority, 2000.
 New Encyclopedia of Archaeological Excavations in the Holy Land vols. 1–5. Ed. E. Stern; Jerusalem: Israel Exploration Society and Carta (1993-2008).

External links

Welcome To Khirbat Karraza
 Khirbat Karraza, Zochrot
Karraza  at Khalil Sakakini Cultural Center
Chorazin—Sitting in the Seat but Missing the Message from waynestiles.com
Strong's G5523
Pictures of Chorazin
The Ancient Synagogue of Chorazin from a Jewish tourism site
Chorazin University of Notre Dame, New Testament Professor David E. Aune
Ancient Chorazin Comes Back to Life by Ze’ev Yeivin of the Biblical Archaeology Society.

 
Archaeological sites in Israel
Gospel of Matthew
Gospel of Luke
New Testament places
Populated places established in the 3rd century
Former populated places in Israel
Roman sites in Israel
Ancient synagogues in the Land of Israel
3rd-century establishments in the Roman Empire
Arab villages depopulated during the 1948 Arab–Israeli War
District of Safad
Sea of Galilee
Upper Galilee